This is a list of surviving Douglas C-47 Skytrain and variant aircraft, including the C-53 Skytrooper, C-117 and R4D.

Ethiopia42-23766: Registered to Ethiopian airlines as ET-T-1 is on display infront of Bole International airport next to Ethiopian Airlines head quarter in Addis Ababa Ethiopia.

Argentina 

Airworthy
 43-49533. LV-BEH, C-47B-15-DK c/n 15349/26794 - ex-Argentine Air Force TC-35, ex-United States Army Air Force 43-49533.
On display
 41-18539. C-47-DL. CTA-15. At Museo de la Aviacion Naval, Bahia Blanca
42-23716. C-47-A.  5-T-22. At Ushuia Aero club.
43-15499. TA-05, ex-Argentine Air Force, at Museo Nacional de Aeronáutica de Argentina, Morón, Buenos Aires. Used in flights to Antarctica.
 43-48194. C-47A-30-DK c/n 25455/14010, ex-Argentine Air Force T-101, at Museo Nacional de Aeronáutica de Argentina. Displayed representing presidential transport LQ-GJT Independencia .

Austria 
On Display

 42-93189. C-47-A. N86U. Arizona Lady. First Austrian DC-3 Dakota Club.

Australia 
Airworthy

 44-76764. C-47-B. Ex RAAF A65-95. Flying as VH-EAE with HARS Aviation Museum.
44-76770. C-47-B. Ex-RAAF A65-98. Flying as VH-OVM with Melbournes Gooney Bird.
44-76774. ex-RAAF A65-94, civil registration VH-EAF – C-47B airworthy in the collection of the Historical Aircraft Restoration Society at the Illawarra Regional Airport in New South Wales; in colours it wore while in service with the Aircraft Research and Development Unit RAAF.

On display

 41-18646 – C-47 under restoration to static display by Jeff Morgan in Karoonda, South Australia. It was previously displayed at a McDonald's.
 42-92711. ex-Royal Australian Navy (RAN) Fleet Air Arm N2-43 – C-47A modified with extended nose to house a radar system from a de Havilland Sea Venom ; on static display in the Fleet Air Arm Museum at naval air station HMAS Albatross near Nowra, New South Wales.
42-93009. VH-EAP. Qantas Founders Museum
42-93199. Painted as VH-EWE. Central Australian Aviation Museum.
44-49377. ex-Papua New Guinea Defence Force (PNGDF) P2-003 – C-47B on outdoor display at a pub in the town of Moree, New South Wales
 44-49379. ex-Royal Australian Air Force (RAAF) A65-64 – C-47B on display mounted on poles outside the RSL Club premises at Mulwala in New South Wales
 44-49870. ex-RAAF A65-71 – C-47B in storage at the Treloar Technology Centre of the Australian War Memorial in Mitchell, Australian Capital Territory .
 44-76345.  ex-RAAF A65-78 – C-47B in storage at the RAAF Museum , located at RAAF Williams in Point Cook, Victoria
44-76547. ex RAAF A65-86. C-47-B. RAAF Amberley Aviation Heritage Center
 44-77128. ex-RAAF A65-114 – C-47B on static display at the South Australian Aviation Museum in Port Adelaide, South Australia .
 45-0957. ex-RAAF A65-124 – C-47B on static display at the Aviation Heritage Museum in Bull Creek, Western Australia.

Belgium 
On Display
 K-16 – C-47B on static display at the Royal Museum of the Armed Forces and Military History in Brussels.

Brasil 
On Display
 43-15495 C-47 B. On Display at Museo Aerospatial.
43-49660. C-47-B. Airworthy, in Mococa, São Paulo, reg PP-VBN

Canada 
Airworthy
 12913 – CC-129 airworthy with Buffalo Airways in Yellowknife, Northwest Territories.
 12932 – CC-129 airworthy with Buffalo Airways in Yellowknife, Northwest Territories.
 12945 – CC-129 airworthy at the Canadian Warplane Heritage Museum in Hamilton, Ontario.
 42-93108 – C-47A airworthy with Buffalo Airways in Yellowknife, Northwest Territories.
 KG563 – Dakota III airworthy with Buffalo Airways in Yellowknife, Northwest Territories.

On Display
 41-18471 – C-47 on static display at the Reynolds-Alberta Museum in Wetaskiwin, Alberta.
 42-92419 – CC-129 on static display at the National Air Force Museum of Canada in Astra, Ontario.
 42-108960 – C-47A on static display at the Aero Space Museum of Calgary in Calgary, Alberta.
 44-76590 – Dakota IV on static display at Greenwood Military Aviation Museum in Greenwood, Nova Scotia.

Chile 
On Display

 42-93390. C-47-A. Museo Nacional Aeronáutico y del Espacio, Los Cerillos Airport, Santiago
 43-15692. C-47-A. Museo Nacional Aeronáutico y del Espacio.
 43-48854. C-47-A. Museo Nacional Aeronáutico y del Espacio

On Restoration process for Display

 43-49697. C-47-B-20-DK. Donated to Ricardo Prambs. Osorno, Region de los Lagos.

China 
Airworthy

 44-77113 – C-47A airworthy with International Air Services of Carson City, Nevada acting as trustee.

On display
 42-92709 – C-47A on static display at the Flying Tigers Heritage Park in Guilin, Guangxi Zhuang.

Colombia 
On Display

 42-23324. C-47 A-1-DL. Air Colombia Villavicencio as HK 3293, Crashed and under restoration
 42-92066. C-47-A-DK. HK 3349. On Display at Tiuma Park, Villavicencio
43-49082. C-47-B. Museo Aero Finix, Cali.
FAC667.  Colombian Aerospace Museum.

Czech Republic 
On Display
 41-18342 – C-47 in storage at Air Parc Zruc in Zruč-Senec, Plzeň.

Denmark 
Airworthy

 43-15553. C-47-A-85DL. OY-BPB. Flying with DC-3 Vennerne
On Display

 42-23802. C-47-A. OY-DDA. Denmarks Tekniske Museum
42-100737. C-47-A. K-687. Danmarks flymuseum, Stauning Airport

Ecuador 
On Display

 44-77164. C-47-B. Quito Air Force Museum.

Finland 
Airworthy

 43-2033 – C-53C-DO OH-LCH with Airveteran Oy in Vantaa, Uusimaa (winters at Vaasa Airport).

On Display

43-48254 OH-LCF (DO-4) – C-47A-30-DK at the Finnish Air Force Museum in Tikkakoski, Jyväskylä.
42-100846 OH-LCD (DO-8) — C-47A-75-DL “Lokki” (‘Seagull’) at the Finnish Aviation Museum in Vantaa, Uusimaa.

France 
Airworthy

 42-23310. C-47-DL. F-BBBE. France DC 3.
44-77020. C-47-B. F-AZOX Chalair. Un Dakota sur Normandie. Caen-Carpiquet Airport.

On Display
 41-18487. C-47-A. Lann-Bihoue air base
42-68810. Gruesome. Musee Aeronatique Bretagne
42-92449. C-47-A. Musée Air Space. Le Bourget. Marked as 42-100558
42-93251. C-47-A. La Ferte Alais Airfield. Also mentioned as 43-15101
42-93654. C -47-A. Ailes Anciennes. Toulouse
42-100825. C-47A on static display at the Airborne Museum in Sainte-Mère-Eglise, Manche. It is painted as 43-15159 The Argonia.
 43-15073. C-47A on static display at the Merville Gun Battery in Merville-Franceville-Plage, Normandy. Saved from scrappers in Bosnia, she is now completely restored in her 1944 configuration.
44-76229. C-47-B On display in Dinard.
44-76420. C-47-B. L Epopee de lIndustrie et de lAeronautique, Albert
44-77047. C-47-B D-day Experience Museum. Dead Mans Corner. Saint Come du Mont, Manche. Painted as 42-92717. Used as simulator for visitors.
44-77116.

Germany 
On Display
 41-20058. C-53. Munich Airport.
42-100997. C-47-A. Flugausstellung Peter Junior. Heremskeil
43-30729. C-47-A. On Display in Fassberg. Painted as 43-15208
43-48189. C-47-A. Auto & Technik Museum. Sinsheim.
43-49081. C-47-B. Frankfurt Airport at Berlin Airlift Memorial
43-49728. /14+01 – C-47B/Dakota IV on static display at the Deutsches Museum Flugwerft Schleissheim in Oberschleißheim, Bavaria.
 43-49866. C-47-B. ex-Royal Australian Air Force (RAAF) A65-69 – C-47B on static display at the Militärhistorisches Museum der Bundeswehr – Flugplatz Berlin-Gatow (Bundeswehr Museum of Military History – Berlin-Gatow Airfield) at the former RAF Gatow air base in Berlin; presented by the Australian government in 1980 to commemorate RAAF aircrews' role in the Berlin Airlift.
45-0951. C-47-B. Berlin Technology Museum.

Greece
Airworthy

 43-16008. C-47-A. Hellenic Air Force

On Display
 43-48981. C-47-B. Converted to a bar, in Athens
43-48991. C-47-A. Hellenic Air Force Museum. Tatoi.
43-49111. C-47-B. Hellenic Air Force Museum. Tatoi.
43-49479. C-47-B. KK 156.  on static display at the Hellenic Air Force Museum located at Dekelia Air Base in Acharnes.
44-76874. C-47-B. SX-ECF.

Hong Kong 
On Display
 41-18385. On display at Hong Kong Science Museum. Ex-Cathay Pacific "Betsy", registered VR-HDB
 Unknown. On display outside Cathay City. As substitution for the lost Cathay Pacific "Niki"

Honduras 
On Display

 42-93701. C-47-A. Honduran Aviation Museum
 FAH-315.  is also reported at Honduran Aviation Museum. Unknown USAAF nr.

Hungary
Airworthy
 43-16026. C-47A (or Lisunov Li-2T) as part of Malev Hungarian Airlines, used in various airshows.

Iceland 
Airworthy

 43-30710. C-47-A. Fly in Icelandair Painting.

India
Airworthy
 44-76488. C-47-B. VP 905 - DC-3 part of Indian Air Force's vintage squadron.

On Display
  43-15546. C-47A-85-DL airframe with c/n 20012 . A very long, multi nation history, was used in India as VT-DTS, and featured in the 1965 Bollywood murder mystery movie "Gumnaam" . It is featured on postage stamps.  https://aviation.stackexchange.com/questions/48535/what-is-that-decommissioned-plane-near-nadirgul-airfield

Indonesia
On Display
 42-23688.
 42-93424. C-47A on display as RI-001 "Seulawah" in Taman Mini Indonesia Indah, East Jakarta, Jakarta
 43-15157. C-47A on display at Garuda Indonesia HQ, Soekarno-Hatta International Airport, Tangerang, Banten
 45-0965. C-47B on display as RI-001 "Seulawah" in Satriamandala Museum, South Jakarta, Jakarta

Israel 
On Display

42-5635. C-47-DL. At Ramon Airport
44-76505. C-47-B. Mitspeh Revivim Museum in the Negev.
44-76975. C-47B-35-DK. At Israeli Air Force Museum at Hatzerim AFB, Beersheba.

Italy 
On Display
 41-7774. C -47-DL. Museo Storico.
42-92834. C-47-A. Parco Tematico dell' Aviazione. Rimini
42-100731. MM61776 - C47B on static display at Italian Air Force Museum, Vigna di Valle
43-48983. C-47B on static display at Volandia in Somma Lombardo, Varese.

Malta 
On Display
 43-15762 – C-47A in storage at the Malta Aviation Museum in Ta' Qali, Attard.
 44-76603 – C-47B under restoration at the Malta Aviation Museum in Ta' Qali, Attard.

Netherlands
Airworthy

44-19434 / 42-100971. C-47A Prinses Amalia in operation, part of the Dutch Dakota Association fleet.

On Display
42-23974. C-47A. De Vliegende Hollander . At Avidrome museum, Lelystad.
43-2022. C-53C. Darlin Dorien. Wings of Liberation Museum. Painted as '290321', which could be read as a military serial (42-90321), but reflects the owner's birthday.
43-15288. C-47A. At Avidrome museum, Lelystad. Under restoration to flying condition as PH-DDZ Doornroosje.
43-15652. T-443 – ex-RDAF K-688, c/n 20118 - C-47B on display at the Nationaal Militair Museum, Soesterberg . 
44-76634. C-47B. At Avidrome museum, Lelystad 
44-76900. C-47B. On Display at Madurodam.

New ZealandAirworthy 43-49219. C-47B-10-DK. ZK-DAK. NZ Warbirds DC-3 Syndicate, Ardmore.
 44-76803. C-47-B. ZK-AWP. Air Chathams.On Display 42-93410. ex-US Navy BuNo 17221 – LC-47H on static display in the collection of the Ferrymead Aeronautical Society at the Ferrymead Heritage Park in Christchurch.
 42-93579. C-47-A. ZK-AMY. Formerly owned by Southern DC-3 trust. At Ashburton Aviation Museum.
 42-100460 – C-47A on static display at a McDonald's in Taupo, Waikato.
 43-15585. C-47-A. ZK-BYF. Gisborne Aviation Museum.
 44-76983.  C-47-B-35DK. ZK-BQK. Former RNZAF NZ3544 1945–1952, written off, sold by tender to National Airways Corporation of NZ and rebuilt. In service 1956–1969. Leased to Polynesian Airways as 5W-FAH 1969–1970. Presented to MOTAT by NAC 1973. Presented in NAC Skyliner colours.  
 45-0960. C-47-B. NZ3551 – C-47B on static display at the Air Force Museum of New Zealand in Christchurch, Canterbury .

 Norway Airworthy 42-68823 C-53D-DO. Little Egypt. Flying with Dakota Norway.On Display 42-93797. C-47-A-25-DK. Flysamlingen Forsvarets museum, Oslo.

 Pakistan 

 41-18470. On display as coffee shop at Shangrila Resort, Skardu

 Philippines 

 48301. On static display at Philippine Air Force Aerospace Museum at Metro Manila.

 Portugal On Display 43-15037. C-47-A. Museo Do Air. Lisabon
43-15289. C-47-A Museo D ar. Sintra.

 Russia Airworthy 42-24173. C-47-A.  N12BA

 Serbia On Display 44-76888 – C-47B on static display at the Aeronautical Museum Belgrade in Surčin, Belgrade.

 Slovenia On Display 43-48199. C-47-A. On Display in Otok, Metlika.

 South Africa 
 6832 – Dakota IIIA on display at the South African Air Force Museum at Air Force Base Ysterplaat.
 6859 – C-47 on display at the South African Air Force Museum at Air Force Base Swartkop.

 South Korea On Display 42-93704. C-47-A. Korean Aerospace Industry Museum
43-15737. C-47-A. Inha University. Incheon.

 Spain On Display 41-18417, C-47-DL. At Son Bonet Airport. Mallorca
43-16134. C-47-B. Museo de Aeronautica, Madrid
45-1091. C-47-B. Malaga Aeronautico Museum. Painted as Iberia.

 Sri Lanka On Display 43-48203. C-47-A. Sri Lanka Air Force Museum

 Sweden Airworthy 43-30732. Served in the Swedish Air Force as 79006. Today still flying with the society Flygande Veteraner under the name "Daisy"On Display Wreckage of 42-5694 on display at the Swedish Air Force Museum in Linköping. The plane last served as TP 79 001 in the Swedish Air Force and was shot down over the Baltic Sea by the Soviet Union while on mission to gather signal-intelligence for the National Defence Radio Establishment (Sweden) in June 1952. The wreckage was discovered in 2003 and recovered in 2004. Exhibited at the museum since 2010.
42-32877. on static display in Karlsborg Sweden at the Swedish Airborne Camp. This plane also served in the Swedish Air Force, as 79002, with signal-intelligence, like 79001 above. Today restored as a Swedish Airborne aircraft from the 60s. It participated in all major Allied Parachute Missions from the Invasion of Sicilly July 1943 over the D-day until Operation Market-Garden in Holland September 1944.
 42-93706. exhibited outside the Swedish Air Force Museum in Linköping. The aircraft served as TP 79 007 in the Swedish Air Force between 1960 and 1982. After Second World War in civilian service in Det Norske Luftselskap in Norway until 1948. In Swedish civilian service 1948–1957 with Scandinavian Airlines and 1957–1960 in Linjeflyg.
 42-24049. On display at a shopping center in Norrtälje, Sweden.

 Switzerland Airworthy 41-18401. C-47-DL. Painted as 43-15087. N 150 D. Owned by Hugo Mathys
41-18542. (or 18541, not confirmed info) C-47-DL. HB-ISB. Classic air. Operated by Classic Air
42-24133. C-47-A-45DL.  NH 431 HM. Painted as Swissair. Owned by Hugo Mathys.On Display 44-77061. C-47-B. Swiss Museum of transport.

 Taiwan On Display 42-93674. C-47-A. At Chung Cheng Aviation Museum. Museum is closed. Removed to an Airbase.

 Thailand On Display 42-108840. C-47-A. At Chiang Mai Air Force Museum.

 Turkey On Display 42-100510. C-47-A. Anadolu University Vecihi Hürkuş Aviation Park
43-49195. C-47-A. At Istanbul Air Force Museum.
 43-15063. C-47-A. Ankara Aviation Museum.

 United Kingdom Airworthy 40-0070. C-41-A. N 341A. Aerotechnics Aviation Inc, Tewkesbury.
42-24338. ZA947 – C-47A/Dakota 3 During the Second World War this aircraft served entirely in Canada. It is airworthy and forms part of the BBMF. It was originally given the serial number KG661 and served with the Royal Aircraft Establishment, but in the late 1970s it was realized that the serial number KG661 had, in fact, previously been allocated to another Dakota which had been destroyed in an accident. The error was reported and in July 1979 the Dakota was allocated the 'modern' serial ZA947, which explains why this serial does not match the age or era of the aircraft.
42-100882. C-47-A. Drag em oot. Aero Legends UK.
42-100884. C-47-A. Mayfly. Flying with Aces High
43-49308. C-47-B. G-AMPY. RVL Aviation.
44-77104. C-47-B. G-ANAF. RVL Aviation.On Display 42-92648. Just a part of the body, at RAF Museum, London
42-100521. Night Fright. Under restoration.
43-15509. Imperial War Museum. Duxford
43-49240. C-47-B. Lilly Belle 2. Wings Museum, Balcombe. With Nose from 42 to 100611. Without Wings.
44-76384. /KN353 – C-47B/Dakota IV on display in taxiable condition at the Yorkshire Air Museum in Elvington, York.
 44-77003. /KN645 – C-47B/Dakota IV on static display at the Royal Air Force Museum Cosford in Cosford, Shropshire.
44-77087. C-47-B. Merville Barracks, Colchester

 United States AirworthyC-47 42-32832 Sky King – Mid America Flight Museum in Mount Pleasant, Texas.C-47A/Dakota III 42-23518 Old Number 30 – Airbase Arizona of the Commemorative Air Force in Mesa, Arizona.
 42-23668 – Yanks Air Museum in Chino, California.
 42-92277/FL633 – WWII Airborne Demonstration Team in Frederick, Oklahoma.
 42-92847 That's All---Brother – restored to airworthy status at Basler Turbo Conversions in Oshkosh, Wisconsin; for the Commemorative Air Force. This airframe was the lead aircraft, after the Pathfinders, for the D-Day invasion and took its first flight in many years on 31 January 2018.
 42-100591 Tico Belle – Valiant Air Command Warbird Museum in Titusville, Florida.
 42-100857 – Elmendorf Air Force Base in Anchorage, Alaska.
 42-100931 Flagship Orange County – Lyon Air Museum in Santa Ana, California. This airframe is painted in a civilian scheme.
 43-15211 – Fantasy of Flight in Polk City, Florida.
 43-15679 – War Eagles Air Museum in Santa Teresa, New Mexico. This airframe is painted in a civilian scheme.
 43-15731 – Museum of Mountain Flying in Missoula, Montana.
 43-30652 Whiskey 7 – National Warplane Museum in Geneseo, New York. This aircraft was a lead plane in Mission Boston during the airborne invasion of Normandy during D-Day.
 43-48080 – Avionics Engineering Center of Ohio University in Albany, Ohio. It is painted in a civilian scheme.C-47B/R4D-6 43-48608 Betsy's Biscuit Bomber – Estrella Warbirds Museum in Paso Robles, California.
 43-48716 – Air Heritage, Inc. in Beaver Falls, Pennsylvania
 50783 Ready 4 Duty – Dallas/Fort Worth Wing of the Commemorative Air Force in Lancaster, Texas.
 50819 – Mid-Atlantic Air Museum in Reading, Pennsylvania.
 50829 – Fargo Air Museum in Fargo, North Dakota.
 44-76423 What's Up Doc? – Palm Springs Air Museum in Palm Springs, California.
 44-76717 Second Chance – American Airpower Museum in Farmingdale, New York.
 44-76791 Willa Dean – Lyon Air Museum in Santa Ana, California.TC-47D 44-76716 – Yankee Air Museum in Belleville, Michigan.TC-47K 99854 Black Sparrow – Basler Turbo Conversions in Oshkosh, Wisconsin. Formerly operated by the Headquarters Squadron of the Commemorative Air Force.C-53D 41-20095 Beach City Baby – This airframe was previously used by the state of Ohio as the governor's aircraft before being put on display at the United States Air Force Museum in Dayton, Ohio.  The Aircraft underwent a lengthy restoration in Franklin, Pennsylvania before making its first post-restoration flight on May 14, 2022 and has since joined the airshow circuit.
 42-68830 D-Day Doll – Inland Empire Wing of the Commemorative Air Force in Riverside, California.On display (complete airframes)C-47 41-7723 – Pima Air & Space Museum in Tucson, Arizona.
 41-18482 – Museum of Alaska Transportation & Industry in Wasilla, Alaska.C-47A/R4D-5 17217 – Pueblo Weisbrod Aircraft Museum in Pueblo, Colorado.
 42-23414 – Stonehenge Air Museum in Fortine, Montana.
 42-92838 – Joe B. Barnes Regional Park in Oklahoma City, Oklahoma.
 42-92841 Turf and Sport Special – Air Mobility Command Museum in Dover, Delaware.
 42-92990 Okie Dokie – Travis Air Force Base Heritage Center in Fairfield, California.

 42-93096 – National World War II Museum in New Orleans, Louisiana.
 42-93168 – Air Zoo in Kalamazoo, Michigan.
 42-100486 Cheeky Charlie – Pacific Aviation Museum in Honolulu, Hawaii.
 42-100828 – Fort Campbell near Clarksville, Tennessee. This airframe was previously operated by the Air Acres Museum in Woodstock, Georgia.
 42-108798/17096 Brass Hat – Don F. Pratt Museum at Fort Campbell near Clarksville, Tennessee.
 42-108808/17106 – Dyess Linear Air Park at Dyess Air Force Base in Abilene, Texas.
 43-15510 – Air Commando Park at Hurlburt Field in Mary Esther, Florida. This airframe is painted as an AC-47D.
 43-15635 Old 635 – National Museum of Transportation in Kirkwood, Missouri.
 43-15977 Seventh Heaven – Castle Air Museum in Atwater, California.
 43-16130 Hi Honey! – Barksdale Global Power Museum in Bossier City, Louisiana.
 43-48098 – Strategic Air Command & Aerospace Museum in Ashland, Nebraska.VC-47A 42-93800 – Eagles Air Museum in West Fargo, North Dakota.C-47B 43-48362 – Fantasy of Flight in Polk City, Florida.
 43-48415 – Kelly Field Annex in San Antonio, Texas.
 43-48459 – Champaign Aviation Museum in Urbana, Ohio.
 43-48932 – 82nd Airborne Division War Memorial Museum in Fayetteville, North Carolina.
 43-49206 – Altus Air Force Base near Altus, Oklahoma.
 43-49270 – Grissom Air Museum in Peru, Indiana.
 43-49355 – Charleston Air Force Base Air Park in North Charleston, South Carolina.
 43-49442 – Museum of Aviation in Warner Robins, Georgia.
 43-49526 – Fairchild Air Force Base near Airway Heights, Washington.
 45-0928 – MAPS Air Museum in North Canton, Ohio.R4D-6 17278 – Silent Wings Museum in Lubbock, Texas.
 50761 – Charles B. Hall Airpark at Tinker Air Force Base near Midwest City, Oklahoma.
 50779 – Gunter Annex in Montgomery, Alabama.
 50793 – Minnesota Air National Guard Museum in St. Paul, Minnesota.
 150190 – Niagara Falls Air Reserve Station near Niagara Falls, New York. This airframe was previously on display at the Museum of Aviation in Warner Robins, Georgia.VC-47D 43-49281 – Hill Aerospace Museum in Roy, Utah.
 44-76326 – Battleship Memorial Park in Mobile, Alabama.
 44-76582 Kilroy is Here – Combat Air Museum in Topeka, Kansas.C-47D 43-49507 – National Museum of the United States Air Force in Dayton, Ohio. It is painted as C-47A, 43–15174; an airframe that crashed in Germany on 24 April 1945.TC-47D 44-76502 – McChord Air Museum in Lakewood, Washington.C-47H 42-93127 – South Dakota Air and Space Museum in Box Elder, South Dakota.C-47K 44-76486 – Air Force Armament Museum at Eglin Air Force Base in Valparaiso, Florida. This airframe is painted as an AC-47.R4D-3 5075 – Museum of Flying in Santa Monica, California.C-53D 42-68835 – Aerospace Museum of California in McClellan, California.C-117C 42-108866 – Goodfellow Air Force Base in San Angelo, Texas. This airframe was previously on display at the Pate Museum of Transportation in Cresson, Texas.C-117D 50826 – Pima Air & Space Museum in Tucson, Arizona.On display (partial airframes)C-47A 43-15912 (Cockpit Only) – San Diego Air & Space Museum in San Diego, California.Under restoration or in storage (complete airframes)C-47A/Dakota III KG587 – under restoration to airworthy at Classic Aircraft Aviation Museum in Hillsboro, Oregon.C-47B 43-16141 – in storage at Burlington Air National Guard Base in South Burlington, Vermont.

 44-76457 – under restoration at Floyd Bennett Field in New York, New York.C-53D 42-68710 – under restoration to airworthy with Saving Lulu Belle, Inc. in Fremont, Ohio.

 Uruguay On Display'

 42-100768 – C-47A on static display at the Colonel Jaime Meregalli Aeronautical Museum in Ciudad de la Costa, Canelones.
 44-77060 – C-47B on static display at the Colonel Jaime Meregalli Aeronautical Museum in Ciudad de la Costa, Canelones.

References

Citations

Bibliography

External links 
 DC3PUBLISHING
 Warbird Registry: Skytrain Registry

Douglas C-47 Skytrain